Gerald Wade "Jerry" Shipkey (October 31, 1925 – November 28, 2009) was a football player. He played as a linebacker for six seasons in the NFL. He also played fullback, especially the first three years of his career.

In college, he played for USC before transferring to UCLA and is believed to be the only person to play in the Rose Bowl for both teams. He attended Anaheim High School.

Notes

External links
Steelers Legends Team

1925 births
2009 deaths
Sportspeople from Fullerton, California
American football linebackers
Pittsburgh Steelers players
Chicago Bears players
Eastern Conference Pro Bowl players
UCLA Bruins football players